Shin Hwa-Yong (Hanja: 申和容; born 13 April 1983) is a South Korean footballer who plays as a goalkeeper. He previously played for Pohang Steelers from 2004 to 2016.

Honours

Club
Pohang Steelers
K League 1: 2007, 2013
K League 1 runner-up: 2004
KFA Cup: 2008
2012 : 2012
2013 : 2013
KFA Cup runner-up: 2007
K-League Cup: 2009
AFC Champions League: 2009

Individual
K-League Best XI: 2009

Club career statistics

References

External links

1983 births
Living people
Association football goalkeepers
South Korean footballers
Pohang Steelers players
Suwon Samsung Bluewings players
K League 1 players
People from Pohang
Sportspeople from North Gyeongsang Province